Mistress is a 1992 comedy-drama film starring Robert De Niro, Danny Aiello,  Eli Wallach, Robert Wuhl and Martin Landau. The picture was written by Barry Primus and J.F. Lawton and directed by Primus.

Plot 
A down-and-out Hollywood screenwriter and director named Marvin Landisman (Robert Wuhl) is working on cheaply made instructional videos when his years-old script is read by Jack Roth (Martin Landau), a has-been producer who offers to help Marvin find investors for his movie.

Three men willing to put up the money are found — the ruthless businessman Evan (Robert De Niro), the disturbed war veteran Carmine (Danny Aiello) and the eccentric millionaire George (Eli Wallach). But each has a mistress he insists be cast in the film in exchange for his financial backing. The women are the highly talented Beverly (Sheryl Lee Ralph), the alcoholic flight attendant Patricia (Jean Smart) and the perky but talentless Peggy (Tuesday Knight).

Marvin repeatedly is asked to compromise his standards and change his script to accommodate these backers until the script becomes almost unrecognizable from its original form. The project also puts a strain on the marriage of Marvin and his long-patient wife Rachel (Laurie Metcalf).

Marvin's screenplay is a bleak one about a painter who commits suicide, and was inspired by the case of an actor named Warren (Christopher Walken) who abruptly committed suicide by jumping off a building in the midst of the making of a film Marvin had been directing. Roth brings in young Stuart Stratland (Jace Alexander) to adapt the script for the investors' mistresses, but not only does Stuart constantly enrage Marvin with his suggested changes, he falls in love with Peggy and they have an affair.

When Marvin's wife demands he grow up and move with her to New York, where she is opening a restaurant, he breaks up with her instead, giving his loyalty to a film that, as she puts it, nobody wants to see. On the verge of signing contracts, everything falls apart, when Beverly discovers that the role she expected to play has been drastically reduced in Peggy's favor.

Marvin is left alone, a broken man, done with Hollywood for good. Or at least until the next time Jack Roth gets in touch.

Cast 

Source:

Reception

Critical response
Rotten Tomatoes gives the film a score of 72% based on 18 reviews.

References

External links

1992 films
American comedy-drama films
Films produced by Robert De Niro
Films about filmmaking
Films about Hollywood, Los Angeles
Films about screenwriters
Films about film directors and producers
1990s English-language films
1990s American films
1992 directorial debut films